Henry Iffanyi Uche (born 18 August 1990) is a Nigerian international footballer who plays as a midfielder for AFC Leopards.

Career

Club career
After playing in Nigeria with Shooting Stars and Enyimba, Uche moved to Albanian club FK Kukësi in January 2014.

Uche signed for AFC Leopards on 15 December 2017.

International career
He made his international debut for Nigeria in 2012.

References

1990 births
Living people
Nigerian footballers
Nigeria international footballers
Nigerian expatriate footballers
Nigerian expatriate sportspeople in Albania
Expatriate footballers in Albania
Association football midfielders
Shooting Stars S.C. players
Enyimba F.C. players
FK Kukësi players
Kategoria Superiore players
People from Umuahia